Maurice Creek (born August 16, 1990) is an American professional basketball player. He played four seasons collegiate for the Indiana Hoosiers and one season for the George Washington Colonials.

High school
Creek graduated from Hargrave Military Academy (Chatham, Virginia), where he averaged 18.4 points, 5 rebounds, 4 assists, 2 steals, and 2 blocks per game, leading his team to a 27–2 record. As a junior, he played first at Oxon Hill High School in Maryland where he averaged 22.3 points per game, and then transferred to South Kent Prep School where he averaged 21.5 points, 4 rebounds and 5 assists. He was named a First-Team Prep School All-American and played in the Reebok All-American game and the Derby Festival. Scout.com ranked Creek as the #9 shooting guard in the 2009 class and #45 in the class overall, while Rivals.com ranked him the 59th best prospect in class overall and the #16 shooting guard in the class. ESPN ranked him as the #15 shooting guard in his class and #61 in the class overall. In the summer he played AAU basketball for Triple Threat.

College career
Creek chose to play collegiate basketball for the Indiana University Hoosiers and major in sport communication broadcast, turning down offers from Marquette, Maryland, Pittsburgh and Texas. Upon committing to Indiana he said among his goals was to "try to get to the national championship to show everybody that Indiana is alive and is always going to be alive for the rest of the time we live."

As a freshman during the 2009–10 season, Creek started the first 12 games of the year before suffering a season-ending injury. In the team's game against Kentucky that year he scored 31 points on 9-of-14 shooting, including 5-of-8 from behind the arc. Following that game he was the top scoring freshman in the country with a 17.3 point average through the first nine games. In seven straight games he scored in double figures and, prior to his injury, was in early discussions for freshman of the year honors.

As a sophomore during the 2010–11 season Creek played in 18 games and started 13 before once again suffering a season-ending injury, this time a stress fracture in his knee that required surgery. Remarkably, just days before the Hoosiers reached the official start of practice for the 2011–12 season, Creek suffered yet another injury, this time a torn left Achilles. The injury was his third within 22 months and caused him to sit out the entire season. As a result, Creek decided to redshirt and is now considered part of the 2014 graduating class with Victor Oladipo and Will Sheehey.

In June 2013, he transferred to George Washington University for his final year of eligibility, where he became the team's leading scorer and hit a buzzer beater to defeat the Maryland Terrapins. That team reached the NCAA tournament, GW's first in a few years.

College statistics

|-
| style="text-align:left;"| 2009–10
| style="text-align:left;"| Indiana
| 12 || 12 || 25.4 || .527 || .448 || .763 || 3.8 || 1.8 || 1.4 || 0.4 || 16.4
|-
| style="text-align:left;"| 2010–11
| style="text-align:left;"| Indiana
| 18 || 13 || 20.0 || .389 || .310 || .808 || 2.4 || 1.2 || 0.2 || 0.2 || 8.3
|-
| style="text-align:left;"| 2011–12
| style="text-align:left;"| Indiana
| style="text-align:center;"; colspan="11"|   injury
|-
| style="text-align:left;"| 2012–13
| style="text-align:left;"| Indiana
| 24 || 0 || 7.8 || .288 || .323 || .800 || 0.9 || 0.4 || 0.3 || 0.1 || 1.8
|-
| style="text-align:left;"| 2013–14
| style="text-align:left;"| George Washington
| 32 || 30 || 29.4 || .414 || .400 || .743 || 3.4 || 1.8 || 1.1 || 0.2 || 14.1
|- class="sortbottom"
| style="text-align:center;" colspan="2"| Career
| 86 || 55 || 20.8 || .422 || .382 || .758 || 2.5 || 1.3 || 0.7 || 0.2 || 9.8

Professional career

Den Helder Kings (2014)
In September 2014, Creek signed with Port of Den Helder Kings of the Dutch DBL. In December, Kings went bankrupt and was dissolved. In his games with Den Helder, he averaged 18.2 points a game, enough for second place in scoring in the DBL.

ZZ Leiden (2015) 
On January 28, 2015, Creek signed with Zorg en Zekerheid Leiden. His season ended when Leiden was defeated 4–2 in the Semi-finals by Donar Groningen.

SISU Copenhagen (2016)
In January 2016, Creek signed with SISU Copenhagen for the remainder of the 2016–17 season.

ETB Wohnbau Baskets (2016–2017) 
On October 31, Creek was acquired by the Santa Cruz Warriors of the NBA Development League, However, he was waived five days later.

Creek spent the 2016–17 season with ETB Wohnbau Baskets of the ProA.

Kobrat (2017–2018) 
Creek spent the 2017–18 season with Kobrat of the Korisliiga.

Kyiv-Basket (2018–2019) 
Creek played for Sideline Cancer in the 2018 edition of The Basketball Tournament. He scored 19 points and had 8 rebounds in the team's first-round loss to Gael Nation.

On August 15, 2018, Creek signed a one-year contract with Kyiv-Basket of the Ukrainian Basketball SuperLeague.

Maccabi Hod HaSharon (2019)
On October 24, 2019, Creek signed a one-year deal with Maccabi Hod HaSharon of the Israeli National League, replacing Lee Moore. On November 26, 2019, he parted ways with Hod HaSharon after appearing in two games.

Prometey (2019–2020) 
On December 26, 2019, Creek signed with Prometey Kamianske of the Ukrainian Basketball SuperLeague.

Steaua București (2020–2021) 
Creek re-joined Sideline Cancer for The Basketball Tournament 2020, but they lost in the championship game against the Golden Eagles.

Creek spent the 2020–21 season with CSA Steaua București of the Liga Națională.

Mykolaiv (2022) 
On January 19, 2022, Creek signed with MBC Mykolaiv of the Ukrainian Basketball SuperLeague. Creek was in Ukraine during the 2022 Russian invasion and escaped to Romania and then arrived back in the USA after a 24 hour ordeal.

References

External links
 Eurobasket.com Profile

1990 births
Living people
American expatriate basketball people in Denmark
American expatriate basketball people in Finland
American expatriate basketball people in Israel
American expatriate basketball people in the Netherlands
American expatriate basketball people in Ukraine
American men's basketball players
B.S. Leiden players
Basketball players from Maryland
BC Kyiv players
BC Prometey players
Den Helder Kings players
Dutch Basketball League players
George Washington Colonials men's basketball players
Guards (basketball)
Indiana Hoosiers men's basketball players
Kobrat players
Maccabi Hod HaSharon players
People from Oxon Hill, Maryland
SISU BK players
Sportspeople from the Washington metropolitan area